Dear Dumb Diary is a Hallmark Channel television film based on the book series of the same name by Jim Benton. It stars Emily Alyn Lind as Jamie Kelly, a seventh-grader who documents her experiences at Mackerel Middle School in her diary, as well as Mary-Charles Jones as her best friend Isabella and Sterling Griffith as popular girl Angeline. The film first aired on the Hallmark Channel on September 6, 2013.

Plot 
Jamie Kelly is a student at Mackerel Middle School. Her closest relationships include her best friend Isabella Vinchella, her 'nemesis' Angeline and her love interest Hudson Rivers. Upon finding out that art classes are being revoked due to budget cuts, she inadvertently signs up for the Jump-A-Thon, which Angeline is also participating in. Jamie and Isabella go door-to-door asking for donations, with Isabella also getting donations for a charity called the "Juvenile Optometry Federation" that provides eyeglasses to poor children in need. Meanwhile, her Aunt Carol applies for a job as a secretary after Jamie accidentally injures an older secretary in Assistant Principal Devon's office.

Aunt Carol starts dating and Jamie tries to figure out who this mysterious date is. Meanwhile, Angeline begins to spend more time around Jamie, although Jamie suspects she has an ulterior motive. Jamie conspires to steal Angeline's permanent record in an attempt to find things she can use to ruin Angeline's reputation. A few days prior to the Jump-A-Thon, Jamie finds out that Isabella lied about the "Juvenile Optometry Federation" and used the money to buy herself some contact lenses. Meanwhile, Jamie's diary is misplaced and found by the other students, who ridicule her for the things she has written. Humiliated, Jamie refuses to return to school and almost bails on the Jump-A-Thon, but decides to attend after some encouraging words from Carol. At the Jump-A-Thon, Jamie learns that Angeline, despite all the sponsors she has received for the Jump-A-Thon, cannot do jump-rope. Against her own preferences, she decides to help Angeline with the aid of Isabella, successfully saving the school's art program. She later learns that Angeline had protected Jamie by claiming that the lost diary belonged to her "cousin Jenny" who goes to a different school.

Jamie's family hosts a gathering at her house, with several teachers and staff members in attendance. At this party, she learns that the mystery boyfriend of Carol is her school's assistant principal, Dan Devon. She also learns that Dan is Angeline's uncle and that he and Carol are engaged, making Angeline and Jamie second cousins. Isabella later starts up her own charity, turning the Juvenile Optometry Foundation into a reality. The movie ends with Jamie concluding that everyone has some form of "inner beauty," though much to her chagrin, Angeline calls her to proclaim that Hudson is going to be her date to Carol and Dan's wedding.

Cast 
 Emily Alyn Lind as Jamie Kelly
 Katy Jensen as Adult Jamie
 Mary-Charles Jones as Isabella
 Sterling Griffith as Angeline
 David Mazouz as Hudson Rivers
 Carson Oliver as Mike Pinsetti
 James Waterston as Assistant Principal Devon
 Laura Bell Bundy as Aunt Carol
 Jacque Gray as Miss Anderson
 Lea DeLaria as Ms. Bruntford
 Maddie Corman as Mrs. Kelly
 Jeffrey Hanson as Mr. Kelly
 Tom Markus as Mr Vandoy
 Duane Stephens as Coach Dover

Production 
The movie was first announced on Jim Benton's website. The movie utilizes plot-lines and aspects from various instalments in the Dear Dumb Diary. The main storylines of the Jump-A-Thon and Aunt Carol's mystery date originate from Never Do Anything, Ever and Can Adults Become Human, respectively. The side story of Jamie stealing Angeline's permanent record is borrowed from Let's Pretend This Never Happened, while the "zone-shampooing" gag originates from a storyline in Am I The Princess Or The Frog. Three of the original songs, "Dear Future Jamie," "My Awesomeness is Awesome," and "Meatloaf Mystery," were written by Dan Mackenzie.  Other songs were written by Steven Argila and Seth Freeman.

Music
The songs include:
 Dear Dumb Diary-performed by Emily Alyn Lind
 Same Girl-performed by Emily Alyn Lind
 Just A Number-performed by Emily Alyn Lind
 My Awesomeness Is Awesome-performed by Emily Alyn Lind
 May The Dumb Be With You-performed by Emily Alyn Lind
 Dear Future Jamie-performed by Emily Alyn Lind
 Meatloaf Mystery-performed by Lea DeLaria
 Perfect People Of The World-performed by Emily Alyn Lind
 Paparazzi-performed by Emily Alyn Lind
 Love Is Everything-performed by Lea Andreone
The soundtrack includes "Score Suite for Dear Dumb Diary" performed by Steven Argila, the film's composer, and "Dear Dumb Diary (Karaoke Mix)" by Emily Alyn Lind.

Reception 
The movie received mixed reviews.
Common Sense Media gave it 4 out of 5 calling it a "books-inspired movie has great social messages for kids". Pretty Famous has ranked the movie 49%.

References

External links
 

Hallmark Channel original films
Films based on American novels
Films based on children's books
2013 television films
2013 films